The  1998–99 NBA season was the Nets' 32nd season in the National Basketball Association, and 23rd season in East Rutherford, New Jersey. On March 23, 1998, the owners of all 29 NBA teams voted 27–2 to reopen the league's collective bargaining agreement, seeking changes to the league's salary cap system, and a ceiling on individual player salaries. The National Basketball Players Association (NBPA) opposed to the owners' plan, and wanted raises for players who earned the league's minimum salary. After both sides failed to reach an agreement, the owners called for a lockout, which began on July 1, 1998, putting a hold on all team trades, free agent signings and training camp workouts, and cancelling many NBA regular season and preseason games. Due to the lockout, the NBA All-Star Game, which was scheduled to be played in Philadelphia on February 14, 1999, was also cancelled. However, on January 6, 1999, NBA commissioner David Stern, and NBPA director Billy Hunter finally reached an agreement to end the lockout. The deal was approved by both the players and owners, and was signed on January 20, ending the lockout after 204 days. The regular season began on February 5, and was cut short to just 50 games instead of the regular 82-game schedule.

In the off-season, the Nets signed free agents Eric Murdock and Scott Burrell, and acquired Jim McIlvaine from the Seattle SuperSonics. However, they struggled and got off to a poor start losing 18 of their first 21 games. Head coach John Calipari was fired after a 3–17 start, and was replaced with assistant Don Casey. At mid-season, Sam Cassell, who was out with an ankle injury after four games, was traded along with Chris Gatling to the Milwaukee Bucks in a three-team trade, as the Nets acquired Stephon Marbury from the Minnesota Timberwolves, and acquired Jamie Feick from the Bucks. As the season progressed, the Nets were dealt with a blow when Jayson Williams suffered a severe knee injury in April, and was out for the remainder of the season after 30 games. Near the end of the season, the team signed free agent and 7' 7" center Gheorghe Mureșan, as the Nets finished last place in the Atlantic Division with a disappointing 16–34 record.

Marbury averaged 23.4 points and 8.7 assists per game with the Nets in 31 games, while second-year star Keith Van Horn averaged 21.8 points and 8.5 rebounds per game. In addition, Kerry Kittles provided the team with 12.9 points and 1.7 steals per game, while Kendall Gill contributed 11.8 points and 2.7 steals per game, and Williams averaged 8.1 points, 12.0 rebounds and 2.0 blocks per game. Murdock provided with 7.9 points, 4.4 assists and 1.5 steals per game in only just 15 games due to a groin injury, and Burrell contributed 6.6 points per game.

Following the season, Murdock was traded to the Los Angeles Clippers, and Rony Seikaly was released to free agency and then retired. For the season, the Nets added new gray alternate road uniforms with dark navy side panels, which were slightly redesigned in 2000.

Offseason

Draft picks

The Nets had no draft picks in 1998.

Roster

Regular season

Season standings

z – clinched division title
y – clinched division title
x – clinched playoff spot

Record vs. opponents

Game log

Player statistics

Regular season

|-
|Stephon Marbury
|31
|31
|39.8
|.439
|.367
|.832
|2.6
|8.7
|1.0
|0.1
|23.4
|-
|Keith Van Horn
|42
|42
|37.5
|.428
|.302
|.859
|8.5
|1.5
|1.0
|1.3
|21.8
|-
|Sam Cassell
|4
|3
|25.0
|.429
|.143
|.935
|1.5
|4.8
|0.8
|0.0
|18.0
|-
|Kerry Kittles
|46
|40
|34.1
|.370
|.316
|.772
|4.2
|2.5
|1.7
|0.6
|12.9
|-
|Kendall Gill
|50
|47
|32.1
|.398
|.118
|.683
|4.9
|2.5
|2.7
|0.5
|11.8
|-
|Jayson Williams
|30
|30
|34.0
|.445
|.000
|.565
|12.0
|1.1
|0.8
|2.0
|8.1
|-
|Doug Overton
|8
|1
|21.8
|.439
|.500
|.857
|2.1
|2.0
|0.4
|0.1
|8.0
|-
|Eric Murdock
|15
|8
|26.7
|.395
|.364
|.808
|2.3
|4.4
|1.5
|0.1
|7.9
|-
|Jamie Feick
|26
|16
|32.7
|.504
|
|.717
|11.0
|0.9
|1.0
|0.7
|6.8
|-
|Scott Burrell
|32
|10
|22.1
|.361
|.389
|.810
|3.7
|1.4
|1.3
|0.3
|6.6
|-
|Chris Carr
|28
|2
|13.0
|.374
|.379
|.694
|2.1
|0.6
|0.3
|0.0
|6.6
|-
|Mark Hendrickson
|22
|6
|18.1
|.443
|.000
|.840
|3.1
|0.6
|0.5
|0.0
|5.5
|-
|Lucious Harris
|36
|5
|16.7
|.403
|.220
|.750
|1.9
|0.9
|0.5
|0.2
|5.4
|-
|Chris Gatling
|18
|2
|15.6
|.371
|.000
|.500
|3.6
|0.7
|0.4
|0.2
|4.7
|-
|Damon Jones
|11
|0
|11.9
|.318
|.345
|.846
|1.2
|1.2
|0.6
|0.0
|4.5
|-
|Earl Boykins
|5
|0
|10.2
|.476
|.200
|
|0.8
|1.2
|0.2
|0.0
|4.2
|-
|David Vaughn
|10
|0
|10.3
|.542
|
|.800
|3.4
|0.1
|0.2
|0.8
|3.4
|-
|Brian Evans
|11
|0
|11.0
|.324
|.364
|1.000
|1.5
|1.3
|0.3
|0.3
|2.7
|-
|Elliot Perry
|30
|0
|8.1
|.349
|.391
|.750
|0.9
|1.2
|0.5
|0.0
|2.6
|-
|Jim McIlvaine
|22
|1
|12.2
|.431
|
|.667
|2.5
|0.1
|0.4
|1.5
|2.2
|-
|Rony Seikaly
|9
|0
|9.8
|.200
|
|.389
|2.3
|0.2
|0.4
|0.7
|1.7
|-
|William Cunningham
|15
|6
|10.7
|.167
|
|.000
|1.9
|0.1
|0.1
|0.7
|0.4
|-
|Gheorghe Muresan
|1
|0
|1.0
|.000
|
|
|0.0
|0.0
|0.0
|0.0
|0.0
|}

Player Statistics Citation:

Awards and records

Transactions

References

See also
 1998–99 NBA season

New Jersey Nets season
New Jersey Nets seasons
New Jersey Nets
New Jersey Nets
20th century in East Rutherford, New Jersey
Meadowlands Sports Complex